James Liddell (born 1897) was a Scottish footballer who played for Albion Rovers, Dumbarton and Clyde.

He joined Liverpool in 1920 but failed to make any first team appearances in his year at Anfield, moving on to Bristol Rovers in 1921. In two and a half years in Bristol he made thirty league appearances, scoring either 4 or 5 goals. In January 1924 he moved to First Division side Preston North End, but as with his time in Liverpool, he didn't make any first team appearances for them.

References

1897 births
People from Baillieston
Scottish footballers
Liverpool F.C. players
Bristol Rovers F.C. players
Dumbarton F.C. players
Albion Rovers F.C. players
Clyde F.C. players
Scottish Football League players
Scottish Junior Football Association players
Date of birth missing
Ashfield F.C. players
Year of death missing
Association football wing halves